Panurea longifolia is a species of flowering plants in the legume family, Fabaceae. It belongs to the subfamily Faboideae. It is the only member of the genus Panurea.

References

Ormosieae
Monotypic Fabaceae genera